Michael James David Robitaille (born February 12, 1948) is a Canadian former professional ice hockey defenceman and commentator. He played in the National Hockey League with the New York Rangers, Detroit Red Wings, Buffalo Sabres and Vancouver Canucks in a career that lasted from 1968 to 1977.

Playing career
Robitaille played in 382 regular season NHL games, scoring 23 goals and adding 105 assists. He was most well known for his punishing hip checks.  He also appeared in 13 playoff games, six with Buffalo and seven for Vancouver, tallying one assist. His career ended pre-maturely in 1977 when he was blind-sided by Dennis Owchar of the Pittsburgh Penguins, which caused nerve damage in his neck. He later won a lawsuit against the Canucks for mistreating his injuries.

Post-playing career
After retiring, Robitaille joined the Sabres' broadcasting arm in 1985. He was one of the founders of Hockey Hotline, the Buffalo Sabres' postgame show on Empire Sports Network, in 1991 and worked for the Sabres and various sister outlets until his retirement from television in 2014. He is known for his colorful analogies and exaggerations.

During the 2000s, Robitaille was the fill-in commentator whenever play-by-play announcer Rick Jeanneret and former color commentators Jim Lorentz or Harry Neale couldn't fulfill their duties on a game day broadcast.

In February 2010, Robitaille was injured in a car accident suffering a spinal cord injury with neurological damage. Robitaille’s injuries from the accident resulted in him missing broadcast duties for the remainder of the 2009-2010 NHL season. Through months of rehabilitation from the time of accident through September of that year, doctors and Robitaille said that he was not at 100% yet. He said he felt ready and returned to his broadcast duties in time for the start of the 2010-11 NHL season with the Sabres. On October 3, 2013, it was announced that Robitaille would be partially retiring after the season and that former Sabres forward Brad May would join the crew on a limited basis before moving into Robitaille's slot in a full-time role the following year. Robitaille continued his radio work and some limited television work during his retirement.

Personal life
Robitaille was born in Midland, Ontario. He lives with his wife, Isabel, in the Buffalo area; the couple also has a second home in Mexico. When not working with the Sabres, Robitaille is the vice president of development and community affairs for his wife's company, Robitaille Real Estate. He has two daughters—Sarah, a salesperson with her mother's company, and Anique, a recording artist in Toronto. Mike Robitaille is distantly related to former NHLer Luc Robitaille. Mike's 6th great-grandfather and Luc's 8th great-grandfather were brothers.

Career statistics

Regular season and playoffs

References

External links

1948 births
Buffalo Bisons (AHL) players
Buffalo Sabres announcers
Buffalo Sabres players
Canadian ice hockey defencemen
Cincinnati Swords players
Detroit Red Wings players
Ice hockey people from Ontario
Kitchener Rangers players
Living people
New York Rangers players
Omaha Knights (CHL) players
People from Midland, Ontario
Vancouver Canucks players